The Rock Paintings of Sierra de San Francisco are prehistoric rock art pictographs found in the Sierra de San Francisco mountain range in Mulegé Municipality of the northern region of Baja California Sur state, in Mexico.

History

The pictographs are likely the artistic products of the Cochimi people in the Baja California peninsula. This group became culturally extinct in the nineteenth century but is comparatively well known through the writings of eighteenth-century Jesuit missionaries. These paintings on the roofs  and walls of rock shelters in the Sierra de San Francisco were first discovered by Europeans in the eighteenth century by the Mexican Jesuit missionary José Mariano Rotea.

According to some native beliefs recorded by the Jesuits and others, the paintings were drawn by a race of giants—a supposition that has been discarded by scientific investigators since the late nineteenth century. This belief may have been suggested by the larger-than-life size of many of the human (as well as animal) figures. Some observers have speculated that the paintings had meanings relating to hunting magic, religious practices, or ancestor worship, but there is no consensus on these interpretations. Animal species including deer, wild sheep,  rabbit, puma, lynx, whale, turtle, fish, and birds are depicted. There are also abstract elements of various forms. A growing body of radiocarbon dates relating to the paintings has suggested ages from as early as 5500 BCE to as late as European contact in the eighteenth century.

Geography
The pictographs are at around 250 sites, which are located east of the El Vizcaino Biosphere Reserve. Access to the paintings is difficult due to the isolated location, which also has helped to minimize vandalism and destruction of the out cropping.

Landmark
The area has one of the most important concentration of Pre-Columbian art on the Baja California Peninsula. It is of exceptional quality at both national and international standards: for the high quality, extent, variety and originality of human and animal representations, remarkable colors, and excellent state of preservation.

In 1989 the rock paintings of Sierra de San Francisco were nominated for, and in 1993 became, a World Heritage Site.

See also 
 Great Mural Rock Art, Baja California

References

External links
UNESCO.org: Rock Paintings of Sierra de San Francisco World Heritage Site
UNESCO.org: Advisory body evaluation
UNESCO.org: Report of the 17th Session of the Committee, with acceptance criteria
Picasa photo set: San Francisco de la Sierra, Baja California Sur
Bradshawfoundation.com: "Baja California - In Search of Painted Caves" — documentary film.
Explore the Rock Paintings of the Sierra de San Francisco in the UNESCO collection on Google Arts and Culture

Petroglyphs in Mexico
Archaeological sites in Baja California Sur
Mulegé Municipality
Pre-Columbian archaeological sites
Protected areas of Baja California Sur
Rock art in North America
World Heritage Sites in Mexico